Tuve Martin Hugo Skånberg von Beetzen (born 9 April 1956) is a Swedish Christian Democratic politician, member of the Swedish Riksdag from 1991 to 2006 and again from 2010 to 2022. Skånberg is Doctor of Theology of Lund University (2003) and a minister of the Mission Covenant Church of Sweden (1980). He was Alderman of the House from 1 January 2020 until he left parliament on 26 September 2022. 

Skånberg has a conservative Christian Democratic political profile. Among his more than 500 bills to the Swedish Riksdag, some have been considered controversial, as Riksdag bills against gay marriage and homosexual adoption, for the banning of blasphemy and for "nondiscrimination" of creationism in Swedish schools and in admission to graduate school.

Skånberg has been a visiting fellow at Cambridge University (2001), a visiting scholar at Jesus College, Cambridge (2001), a distinguished professor in history at Graduate Theological Union (2006), a visiting scholar at Stanford University (2006), an adjunct associate professor of church history at Fuller Theological Seminary (2006/2007, 2010), a guest professor in patristic at Saint Petersburg Evangelical Academy (2007), and director of the Clapham Institute (2008).

Publications 
Sövestads by och dess gamla fogdesläkt (1991)
"Till enn nådigh Lösen", Måns Bonde till Traneberg och konflikten med Gustav Vasa (2001)
Glömda gudstecken. Från fornkyrklig dopliturgi till allmogens bomärken (2003) 
I maktens korridorer. Handbok för nyblivna riksdagsledamöter (2006), coauthor Johnny Gylling)

Sources 
The website of the Swedish Parliament Riksdagen
Skånberg's website at the website of the Swedish Christian Democrats

References

1956 births
Christian creationists
Living people
Members of the Riksdag 1991–1994
Members of the Riksdag 1994–1998
Members of the Riksdag 1998–2002
Members of the Riksdag 2002–2006
Members of the Riksdag 2010–2014
Members of the Riksdag 2014–2018
Members of the Riksdag 2018–2022
Members of the Riksdag from the Christian Democrats (Sweden)